The 1996–97 Fairfield Stags men's basketball team represented Fairfield University in the 1996–97 NCAA Division I men's basketball season. The Stags, led by sixth-year head coach Paul Cormier, played their home games at Alumni Hall in Fairfield, Connecticut as members of the Metro Atlantic Athletic Conference. They finished the season 11–19, 2–12 in MAAC play to finish in eighth place. In the MAAC tournament, they went on a surprising run to the title by defeating Iona, Saint Peter's, and Canisius to earn an automatic bid to the NCAA tournament as No. 16 seed in the East region. In the opening round, the Stags were beaten by No. 1 seed and eventual Final Four participant North Carolina in a competitive game, 82–74.

As of the 2021 NCAA Tournament, this Fairfield team is tied with FIU (1995) and UCF (1996) for worst record for an NCAA Tournament team at 11–18.

Roster

Schedule and results

|-
!colspan=12 style=| Regular season

|-
!colspan=12 style=| MAAC Tournament

|-
!colspan=12 style=| NCAA Tournament

|-

Source

References

Fairfield Stags men's basketball seasons
Fairfield Stags
Fairfield
Fairfield Stags men's basketball
Fairfield Stags men's basketball